Pseudomonas amyloderamosa is a Gram-negative soil bacterium that produces isoamylase. Because this organism is patented, it is not officially recognized as a legitimate Pseudomonas species, and therefore has no type strain. It is available, however, through the American Type Culture Collection.

References

Pseudomonadales
Bacteria described in 1971